Jefferson David Savarino Quintero (born 11 November 1996) is a Venezuelan professional footballer who plays as a winger for Major League Soccer club Real Salt Lake  and the Venezuela national team.

Club career

Real Salt Lake
On 9 May 2017, Savarino joined Major League Soccer side Real Salt Lake on loan from Zulia of Venezuela. He subsequently signed permanently for the club.  In total, he scored 22 goals in three seasons with RSL. In May of 2022, RSL announced that Savarino was resigned to the team.

Atlético Mineiro
On 7 February 2020, Real Salt Lake announced the transfer of Savarino to Brazilian club Atlético Mineiro.

Career statistics

Club

Notes

International

International goals
Scores and results list Venezuela's goal tally first.

Honours
Zulia
Venezuelan Primera División: Clausura 2016
Copa Venezuela: 2016

Atlético Mineiro
Campeonato Brasileiro Série A: 2021
Copa do Brasil: 2021
Campeonato Mineiro: 2020, 2021, 2022
Supercopa do Brasil: 2022

References

External links

1996 births
Living people
Venezuelan footballers
Venezuela international footballers
Venezuela under-20 international footballers
Association football forwards
Venezuelan Primera División players
Major League Soccer players
Zulia F.C. players
Real Salt Lake players
Clube Atlético Mineiro players
Designated Players (MLS)
2019 Copa América players
2021 Copa América players
Campeonato Brasileiro Série A players
Venezuelan expatriate footballers
Venezuelan expatriate sportspeople in the United States
Expatriate soccer players in the United States
Venezuelan expatriate sportspeople in Brazil
Expatriate footballers in Brazil
Sportspeople from Maracaibo